Torkwase Dyson is an interdisciplinary artist based in Brooklyn, New York, United States. Her work has been exhibited at the Studio Museum in Harlem, the Whitney Museum of American Art, The Museum of Modern Art, New York

,the Corcoran College of Art and Design, and the Smithsonian National Museum of African Art. She describes the themes of her work as "architecture, infrastructure, environmental justice, and abstract drawing." In 1999 she received a BFA from Virginia Commonwealth University and her MFA from Yale School of Art in painting/printmaking in 2003. In 2016, Dyson was elected to the board of the Architectural League of New York as Vice President of Visual Arts. In 2017, she was on the faculty of the Skowhegan School of Painting and Sculpture. She is a visiting critic at Yale School of Art.

Projects

Studio South Zero 
Studio South Zero (SSZ) is a solar-powered, mobil art studio Dyson uses in her installations.

Conditions of Fresh Water 
Conditions of Fresh Water (2015-2017) is a project about "black Southern geography and the struggle for environmental justice."

The Wynter-Wells Drawing School for Environmental Justice 
The 2018 Wynter-Wells Drawing School for Environmental Justice, named for Jamaican writer Sylvia Wynter and American civil rights leader Ida B. Wells, is a two-week series of classes, discussions, and experiments held at the Drawing Center.

The Wynter-Wells School 
In 2018, The Graham Foundation for Advanced Studies in the Arts presented an exhibition of Dyson's work building off of her two-week residency at the Drawing Center, Winter Term. The exhibition consisted of new site-specific drawings and a series of programming under the title The Wynter-Wells Drawing School for Environmental Liberation, as part of Dyson's pedagogical approach to art-making, consisting of a series of workshops, lectures, and an open studio where Dyson would actively produce and alter the work on view in front of the public.

Exhibitions

Solo

2018 
 Graham Foundation, Wynter-Wells School, May 3–July 14
 Davidson Gallery, New York, NY, Dear Henry, March 15–May 5
 The Drawing Center, New York, NY, Black Compositional Thought and the Wynter-Well Drawing School for Environmental Justice, February 24–March 11

2017 
 Texas Tech University, Landmark Gallery, Lubbock, TX, Hidden in Plain Site: Black Paintings

2016 
 Second Street Gallery, Charlottesville, VA, Mine Mind, May 27–June 23
 Eyebeam, Brooklyn, NY, Unkeeping, March 9–April 12
 Hemphill Fine Arts, Washington DC, Illegal Abstraction, October 27, 2016 – January 27, 2017

2014 
 Clark University, Schiltkamp Gallery, Worcester, MA Mine: Painting and Drawing October 1–October 31

2008 
 Meat Market Gallery, Washington DC, Hereinafter 
 Corcoran School of the Arts and Design, 31 Gallery, Washington, DC, The Rhymes Cost But the Guck is for Free

Select group

2018 
 Whitney Museum of American Art, New York, NY, Between the Waters, March 18–

2017 
 ArtCenter / South Florida, Miami FL, On Documentary Abstraction, September 30, 2017 – January 2, 2018
 Harvey B. Gantt Center, Charlotte NC, The Future is Abstract, January 28–July 8
 Koenig & Clinton, Brooklyn, NY, Lack of Location is My Location, November 3, 2017 – January 14, 2018
 Hemphill Fine Art, Washington, DC, 35 Days, June 24–August 11
 3LD Art & Technology Center, New York, NY, Works on Water, June 5–30 
 Martos Gallery, New York, NY, Invisible Man, May 3–June 24 
 Kathryn Markel Fine Arts, New York, NY, Stack, May 11–June 17 
 Jenkins Johnson Gallery, San Francisco, CA, Dialogues, On Drawing, March 16–May 23 
 Tiger Strikes Asteroid, Brooklyn, NY, x ≈ y: An Act of Translation

2016 
 Duke University, Center for Documentary Studies, Durham NC, In Conditions of Freshwater, March 2–June 10 
 PostMasters Gallery, New York, NY, Grey Scale, June 24–August 16 
 Kravets Wehby Gallery, New York, NY, The Block Party, July 14 – August

2015 
 Studio Museum in Harlem, New York, NY, A Constellation, November 12, 2015 – March 6, 2016 
 Eyebeam, 101 Front St. Galleries, Brooklyn, NY, Annual Showcase, January 29–February 21 
 South Street Seaport Cultural Building, New York, NY, Outside In, October 2–November 13 
 Socrates Sculpture Park, Long Island City, NY, EAF 15: 2015 Emerging Artist Fellowship Exhibition, September 27, 2015 – March 16, 2016

2014 
 Franconia Sculpture Park, Shafer, MN, Emerging Artist Fellowship Exhibition
 United Nations, New York, NY, Africa Extended

2011 
 Reginald F. Lewis Museum, Baltimore, MD, Material Girls: Contemporary Black Women Artists, February 12–October 16

2010 
 Whitney Museum of American Art, New York, NY, 2010 Whitney Biennial Monastic Residency, May7–May 9
 Schuylkill Center for Environmental Education, Philadelphia, PA, Ephemerality, January 12–April 12

2008 
 Flanders Art Gallery, Raleigh, NC, Spectrum-ed, June 1–July 1 
 Arlington Center for the Arts, Arlington, VA, She's So Articulate 
 African American Museum, Dallas, TX, It Might Blow Up, But It Won't Go Pop

Select lectures and panels

2018 
Graham Foundation, Chicago, IL, Christina Sharpe and Torkwase Dyson in Conversation, June 14
Mississippi Museum of Art, Jackson, MS, Race, Space, and Abstraction in the American South, February 17
 Drawing Center, New York, NY, Wynter-Wells Drawing School for Environmental Justice Panel Discussion, March 1

2017 
 Duke University, Durham, NC, In Conditions of Fresh Water, March 20
 Metropolitan Museum of Art, New York, NY, Artists on Artworks series, Three Conditions of Space, March 24
 The New School, New York, NY, Visiting Artist Lecture Series, April 26
 Skowhegan School of Painting and Sculpture, Skowhegan, ME, Barbara Lee Lecture Series, June 23
 ArtCenter / South Florida, Miami FL, On Documentary Abstraction, August 30
 Pennsylvania Academy of the Fine Arts, Philadelphia, PA, Hyper Shape, December 6
 Design Miami, Miami, FL, Concept, Abstraction, Blackness, December 8

2016 
 Studio Museum in Harlem, New York, NY, The Artist's Voice, February 4
 Eyebeam, New York, NY, Black Spatial Matters, April 9
 University of Arizona, Tucson, AZ, Visual Artists and Scholars Committee, Illegal Abstraction A Single Author, October 6
 Hunter College, New York, NY, On Painting, October 19 
 Drawing Center, New York, NY, Open Session 9: Cartography of Ghosts, December 15

2015 
 University of Pennsylvania, Philadelphia, PA, Values of Color, February 20

2014 
 Reed College, Portland, OR, Nothing Disappears: Site/Environment/Installation and the Re-alignments Happening in My Imagination, April 17
 Brown University, Brown International Advanced Research Institutes (BIARI) Connections and Flows: Water, Energy and Digital Information in the Global South, Studio South Zero: Looking at Urban Ecological Aesthetics, June 19

References

External links 
Official website

Living people
Year of birth missing (living people)
Artists from Brooklyn
21st-century American artists
21st-century African-American artists